Christopher Kane  (born 31 May 1993) is a Scottish professional footballer who plays as a defender for Scottish League Two side Bonnyrigg Rose Athletic.

Career
Kane signed for Hearts in 2005 from Edinburgh rivals Hibernian, where he progressed through the youth ranks and went on to captain the Hearts under-19 squad. On 17 December 2011, he was promoted to the first team being named a substitute against Dunfermline, after the late withdrawal of Andy Driver.

On 31 May 2012, it was announced that Kane had signed a two-year contract with Scottish First Division side Dunfermline Athletic. He made his first team debut as a substitute on 28 July 2012 in a Challenge Cup match against Forfar Athletic. He made his league debut on 1 September, coming on as an 80th-minute substitute replacing Stephen Husband in a 3–1 win over Raith Rovers.

On 18 January 2014, Kane joined Cowdenbeath after leaving Dunfermline Athletic. After two and a half years at Cowdenbeath, Kane signed for Fife rivals East Fife in May 2016.

After a season at Edinburgh City, Kane joined Stenhousemuir in August 2020. He rejoined Edinburgh City during the 2021 close season. On 14 January 2022, Edinburgh City confirmed that Kane had left the club following the expiration of his contract.

On 4 November 2022, Kane signed for Scottish League Two side Bonnyrigg Rose Athletic.

Career statistics

References

External links

1993 births
Association football midfielders
Dunfermline Athletic F.C. players
Heart of Midlothian F.C. players
Living people
Scottish Football League players
Scottish footballers
Scottish Professional Football League players
Cowdenbeath F.C. players
East Fife F.C. players
F.C. Edinburgh players
Stenhousemuir F.C. players
Bonnyrigg Rose Athletic F.C. players